Popovac is a village in the municipality of Paraćin, Serbia. According to the 2002 census, the village has a population of 805 people.

References

Populated places in Pomoravlje District

На иницијативу групе младих Поповчана, основано је омладинско удржење „Омладина Поповца“ и регистровано  у Агенцији за привредне регистре као удружење младих .

На оснивачкој скупштини, која је одржана 01.09.2013. године, изабрани су чланови Управног и Надзорног одбора, изгласани Статут и циљеви организације:

„Омладина Поповца је удружење младих која има за циљ унапређење живота младих у Поповцу, путем  организовања спортских, културних и рекреативних манифестација, као и заштите животне средине, одређеног подручја и угрожене групе грађана.